Marguerite McDonald is an eye surgeon who in 1987 performed the first excimer laser treatment. In 1993 she became the first to use this treatment to treat farsightedness. In September 2003, she became the first person in North America to perform Epi-LASIK. She has also conducted the first wavefront-based laser surgeries in the United States. She was a co-developer of Kaufman-McDonald epikeratophakia.

Her poster titled “Wavefront Technology Improves Vision by Reducing Aberrations in Progressive Lenses”  was awarded the “Best Poster” award by the American Academy of Ophthalmology in 2010. In 2012 she became the first person to receive the Visionary Woman Award from the group Ophthalmic Women Leaders, which she was one of the founders of (along with Tamara Church Swanson, who came up with the idea, and Jan Beiting).

She was the first female president of both the American Society of Cataract and Refractive Surgery (ASCRS) and the International Society of Refractive Surgery (ISRS).

As of 2013 she works as a specialist with Ophthalmic Consultants of Long Island, Lynbrook, N.Y., a clinical professor of ophthalmology at New York University, an adjunct clinical professor of ophthalmology at Tulane University Health Sciences Center in New Orleans, a staff physician at Manhattan Eye Ear and Throat Hospital in New York City, and an employee at the Island Eye Center in Carle Place, New York and Memorial Medical Center in Rockville Centre, NY.

References

American surgeons
Living people
American ophthalmologists
New York University faculty
Tulane University faculty
American medical academics
Year of birth missing (living people)
Women surgeons
Women ophthalmologists